Stray Toasters is a four-issue comic book mini-series created, written and illustrated by Bill Sienkiewicz and published by Marvel Comics's imprint Epic Comics in 1988.
Although it was critically acclaimed, it never reached widespread circulation like Sienkiewicz's later works.

The story revolves around criminal psychologist Egon Rustemagik and his investigation of a serial killer who seems to be targeting women.

Characters
 Phil - Satan. Narrative indicated by red boxes and postcards to his family: wife Emily, sons Timmy and Brad.
 Todd - A boy, possibly autistic.
 Deborah Dissler - The first victim. Called Todd her son.
 Abigail "Abby" Nolan - A psychiatric counselor.
 Dr. Egon Rustemagik - A criminal psychologist.
 Mona
 Harvard Chalky - Assistant District Attorney.
 Dr. Montana Violet - A crazed cyanotic scientist who is slowly degenerating, is fed by birds, is mechanically bound to a "throne", and tends to use quotations.
 Dahlia

References

1988 comics debuts
Marvel Comics graphic novels
Crime comics